Bobs Knob is a summit in McDonald County in the U.S. state of Missouri.

Bobs Knob has the name of "Old Bob", a pioneer citizen.

References

Mountains of McDonald County, Missouri
Mountains of Missouri